James Hamilton, 1st Duke of Châtellerault, 2nd Earl of Arran ( 1519 – 22 January 1575), was a Scottish nobleman and head of the House of Hamilton. A great-grandson of King James II of Scotland, he was heir presumptive to the Scottish throne (1536–1540, 1541–1542, 1542–1566 and 1567–1575). Arran was Regent of Scotland during the minority of Mary, Queen of Scots from 1543 to 1554, when he lost the regency to Mary of Guise. At first pro-English and Protestant, he converted to Catholicism in 1543 and supported a pro-French policy. He reluctantly agreed to Mary's marriage to Francis, eldest son of King Henry II of France, and was rewarded by Henry by being made Duke of Châtellerault in 1549. During the Scottish Reformation, Châtellerault joined the Protestant Lords of the Congregation to oppose the regency of Mary of Guise, and lost his French dukedom as a result.

Family 
James Hamilton was born about 1519 in Hamilton in Lanarkshire. He was the eldest legitimate son of James Hamilton, 1st Earl of Arran by his second wife, Janet Beaton (or Bethune). His paternal grandmother, Mary, was the eldest daughter of King James II. His father's family descended from Walter FitzGilbert, the founder of the House of Hamilton, who had received the barony of Cadzow from Robert the Bruce.

James's mother was the daughter of Sir David Beaton of Crich, the widow of Robert Livingstone of Easter Wemyss, and the second wife of the 1st Earl of Arran. Both parents were Scottish. They had married in 1516.

In 1529 he succeeded his father as Earl of Arran while still a minor. He was made a ward of James Hamilton of Finnart, his illegitimate elder half-brother.

Marriage

In 1532 Lord Arran married Margaret Douglas, who was about ten years older than him. She was a daughter of James Douglas, 3rd Earl of Morton, and Catherine Stewart, herself a natural daughter of James IV. The marriage was arranged by James Hamilton of Finnart. Margaret Douglas was given the house and lands of Kinneil House for her lifetime should her husband die before her. James Hamilton of Finnart paid Morton 4,000 marks as part of the marriage settlement. 

 
James and Margaret had five sons:
James (1537–1609), succeeded him as the 3rd Earl of Arran but became insane in 1562
Gavin, died young
John (1540–1604), became the 1st Marquess of Hamilton
David (died 1611)
Claud (1546–1621), from whom descend the earls, marquesses and dukes of Abercorn

—and four daughters:
Barbara, married in 1553 James Fleming, 4th Lord Fleming
Jean, married Hugh Montgomerie, 3rd Earl of Eglinton in 1555
Anne (c. 1535 – before April 1574), married George Gordon, 5th Earl of Huntly
Margaret, married Sir Alexander Pethein (Peden)

In 1544 Arran tried to divorce his wife. She seemed to have been suffering of poor mental health. Significantly two of their sons, James and Claud, later became insane.

An inventory of a chest of Margaret Douglas's clothes includes a purple velvet night gown with gold passementerie lined with red taffeta, a gown of black cloth of gold with gold passementerie lined with black taffeta, and other gowns and kirtles.

Regent of Scotland 
In 1536, on the death of John Stewart, Duke of Albany, grandson of King James II, Lord Arran, came to be next in line to the throne after the King's descendants. Several of the children of the immediate royal family proved to be short-lived, so on the death of King James V on 14 December 1542 at only 30, the Earl of Arran stood next in line to the Scottish throne after the king's six-day-old daughter Mary, Queen of Scots, for whom Arran was appointed Governor and Protector of Scotland. In 1543, supporters of Matthew Stewart, 4th Earl of Lennox, challenged Arran's claim and legitimacy by suggesting that his father's divorce and second marriage were invalid.

Pro-English policy

Initially, Arran was a Protestant and a member of the pro-English party. In 1543 he helped to negotiate the marriage of the young Queen Mary to Edward, son of King Henry VIII of England, who had broken with Rome. In the same year he authorised the translation and reading of the Bible in the vernacular. On 27 January 1543 he arrested Cardinal Beaton, who favoured the Auld Alliance. Beaton was imprisoned at Dalkeith Palace and then Blackness Castle. However, Henry VIII doubted Arran's commitment to English policy and wanted him deposed. On 18 March 1543, Sir George Douglas of Pittendreich, brother of Lord Angus, told the English ambassador, Ralph Sadler, that:

"if there be any motion now to take the Governor from his state, and to bring the government of this realm to the king of England, I assure you it is impossible to be done at this time. For, there is not so little a boy but that he will hurl stones against it, and the wives will handle their distaffs, and the commons universally will rather die in it, yea, and many noblemen and all the clergy be fully against it."

Pro-French policy
In September 1543 Arran turned around. He secretly met Cardinal Beaton at Callendar House and reconciled himself with his former enemy. Shortly after he became Catholic and joined the pro-French faction. Around this time Friar Mark Hamilton wrote a history of the Hamilton family. A seven-year war with England now called the Rough Wooing followed, which was declared on 20 December 1543, and signed by Arran the following month. The declaration of war was brought by Henry Ray to give to the Parliament of Scotland. Arran replied that the parliament was dissolved, and so he thought it expedient not to answer Henry VIII on the points raised at the time.

In 1544 an attempt was made to transfer the regency from him to Mary of Guise, Queen Mary's mother, but Arran fortified Edinburgh and her forces retired. However, in March 1545 he agreed to abandon some of his responsibilities to her.

In June 1547 Arran gathered a large army to expel the English from Langholm and the surrounding area. He had a banner made from taffeta decorated with gold foil and colours, and another banner for his trumpeter. Horses dragged the artillery and carts laden with cannon balls and tents out of Edinburgh Castle. The guns were dragged toward Langholm with oxen. Arran had an armoured "jack" covered with purple taffeta, then changed his mind, choosing purple velvet. A Scottish spy, David Maitland, who signed himself "Ye Wait Quha" wrote of the preparations to Thomas Wharton, that it was "the starkest host and the monest, and with the best order that wes sen Flodwn", that is, "the strongest host and most numerous, in the best order since Flodden."

In September 1547 Arran assembled a large Scottish army to resist an English invasion led by Edward Seymour, Duke of Somerset but was defeated at the battle of Pinkie. He was forced to abandon some of his clothes at the battlefield. He nevertheless held onto the regency and continued to lead forces against the occupying troops. For two weeks in February 1548 Arran led a campaign in Teviotdale with Monsieur d'Essé to recapture Ferniehirst Castle and punish borderers. He held discussions at Jedburgh with Nicolas Durand de Villegaignon over the site and financing of a new fort.

Arran reluctantly agreed in July 1548 to Mary's marriage to Francis, eldest son of King Henry II of France. Henry II rewarded him by making him Duke of Châtellerault on 8 February 1549 and a knight of the Order of Saint Michael.

On 19 April 1550 Regent Arran and his Privy Council made legislation about foodstuffs and rising prices. The people of Scotland were to reduce their diets and banqueting. Prices were set for wild birds and rabbits, swans would be 5 shillings, plovers 5 pence. River birds including herons and ducks were to be caught by hawking. It was forbidden to shoot deer or birds for the table with "half hag or culverin or pistolate". These acts were ratified by Parliament.

Post-regency 

In 1554, Châtellerault, as he was now, surrendered the regency to Mary of Guise, and was appointed her lieutenant in Scotland. He gave up the regency on the condition that he would be Queen Mary's heir if she died childless. The Scottish succession, however, had been secretly promised to France.

In the first months of the Scottish Reformation Châtellerault continued to support Mary of Guise. He faced a Protestant army with the French commander at Cupar Muir in June 1559. He changed his allegiance in August 1559, joining the Protestant Lords of the Congregation to oppose the regency of Mary of Guise, and lost his French dukedom as a result. In order to discredit him with the English government a letter was forged by his enemies, in which Châtellerault declared his allegiance to Francis II of France, but the plot was exposed. On 27 February 1560 he agreed to the Treaty of Berwick with Queen Elizabeth I of England, which placed Scotland under English protection.

After the death of Mary of Guise on 15 June 1560, Châtellerault persuaded the Parliament of Scotland to back a plan to marry his son James to Elizabeth I, and then after the death of Francis II on 5 December 1560 he attempted, without success, to arrange for James to marry the young widowed Queen Mary. However, Mary married Lord Darnley in 1565.

In 1566 Châtellerault withdrew to his estates in France, where he made vain attempts to regain his confiscated duchy. In 1569, he returned to Scotland in support of Mary but was imprisoned by Murray who assembled a parliament and had him declared a traitor. Murray was assassinated on 23 January 1570 while Châtellerault was still in prison. Nevertheless, Châtellerault was rumoured to have been an accomplice in the regent's murder. Châtellerault was released from prison on 20 April 1570. In 1573 he gave up his support for Mary and recognised Mary's infant son James VI as king.

Châtellerault died at Hamilton on 22 January 1575. He was succeeded by his eldest son James as the 3rd Earl of Arran. However, as James was insane, John his younger brother stood in for him.

Timeline

Genealogical chart

Notes and references

Notes

Citations

Sources 

  – 1547 to 1563
  – 1543 to 1590 (for the letter, dated the 4 September 1543, from Ralph Sadler to Suffolk and Tunstall)
 
 

 
  – for Walter FitzGilbert
 
  – Scotland and Ireland
 
  
  – (for timeline)
 
 
  – Fife to Hyndford (for Duke of Hamilton)

Attribution

Further reading 
 Franklin, David Byrd (1995). The Scottish Regency of the Earl of Arran: A Study in the Failure of Anglo-Scottish Relations. Edwin Mellen Press.
 Melanie Schuessler Bond, Dressing the Scottish Court: 1543-1553 (The Boydell Press: Woodbridge, Suffolk, 2019).

 

1510s births
1575 deaths
16th-century Scottish peers
16th-century Scottish landowners
16th-century viceregal rulers
Court of James V of Scotland
501
Earls of Arran
James Hamilton
James
Members of the pre-1707 Parliament of Scotland
Privy Council of Mary, Queen of Scots
Regents of Scotland
Scottish people of the Rough Wooing
Scottish Protestants
Scottish Reformation
Scottish Roman Catholics
Year of birth uncertain
Non-inheriting heirs presumptive